was a town located in Kitaamabe District, Ōita Prefecture, Japan.

As of 2003, the town had an estimated population of 12,367 and the density of 250.39 persons per km2. The total area was 49.39 km2.

On January 1, 2005, Saganoseki, along with the town of Notsuharu (from Kitaamabe District), was merged with the expanded city of Ōita.

Dissolved municipalities of Ōita Prefecture